Shahababad (also Romanized as Shahābābād) is a village in Dehqanan Rural District, in the Central District of Kharameh County, Fars Province, Iran. At the 2006 census, its population was 245, in 49 families.

References 

Populated places in Kharameh County